Full Sail is the third album by singer-songwriter duo Loggins and Messina, released in 1973. It showed the versatility of the duo, with everything from 1950s retro to island-style to soft ballads. The single "My Music" charted at No. 16, and the follow-up, "Watching the River Run", made it to No. 71. The album as a whole did better, reaching No. 10 on the Pop Charts.

Track listing

Side one
"Lahaina" (Jim Messina) – 2:32 (lead singer: Jim Messina)
"Travelin' Blues" (Messina) – 3:44 (lead singer: Jim Messina)
"My Music" (Kenny Loggins, Messina) – 3:04 (lead singer: Jim Messina)
"A Love Song" (Loggins, Dona Lyn George) – 3:11 (lead singer: Kenny Loggins)
"You Need a Man/Coming to You" (Messina) – 5:22/3:48 (No track split) (lead singers: Kenny Loggins [You Need a Man]/Jim Messina [Coming to You])

Side two
"Watching the River Run" (Messina, Loggins) – 3:27 (lead singers: Kenny Loggins, Jim Messina)
"Pathway to Glory" (Messina) – 8:37 (lead singer: Jim Messina)
"Didn't I Know You When" (Loggins, Michael Omartian) – 2:40 (lead singer: Kenny Loggins)
"Sailin' the Wind" (Daniel Loggins, Dann Lottermoser) – 6:09 (lead singer: Kenny Loggins)

Personnel
 Kenny Loggins – vocals, rhythm guitar, acoustic guitar, harmonica
 Jim Messina – vocals, lead guitar, acoustic guitar, mandolin

Loggins & Messina band
 Jon Clarke – oboe, baritone saxophone, bass saxophone, soprano saxophone, tenor saxophone, flute, alto flute, bass flute, bass clarinet, English horn
 Al Garth – violin, bass clarinet, recorder, alto saxophone, tenor saxophone
 Larry Sims – bass, backing vocals
 Merel Bregante – drums, timbales, backing vocals

Additional musicians
 Michael Omartian – keyboards
 Vince Charles – steel drums
 Milt Holland – percussion

Production
 Producer – Jim Messina
 Photography – Ed Caraeff
 Art Direction – Ron Coro
 Illustrations – Joe Garnett
 Engineers – Jim Messina and Alex Kazanegras
 Quadraphonic Mix – Larry Keys and Alex Kazanegras
 Quadraphonic Mix Supervision – Al Lawrence and Alex Kazanegras

Charts
Album – Billboard (United States)

Singles – Billboard (United States)

References

Loggins and Messina albums
1973 albums
Albums produced by Jim Messina (musician)
Columbia Records albums
Albums recorded at Wally Heider Studios